Matsi is a village in Lääneranna Parish, Pärnu County, in southwestern Estonia, on the coast of the Gulf of Riga. It has a population of 17 (as of 1 January 2011).

Orasaare Manor (Orrasaar), support manor of Saulepi manor, was located in Matsi.

Heavyweight wrestler and Olympic winner Kristjan Palusalu (1908–1987), was born in Varemurru village which is now part of Matsi village.

References

External links
Website of Saulepi region (Kulli, Maade, Matsi, Õhu, Rädi, Raespa, Saare, Saulepi and Vaiste villages) 

Villages in Pärnu County
Kreis Wiek